The Burano is a river in the Umbria and Marche regions of Italy. Its source is in the province of Perugia in the Appennino Umbro-Marchigiano mountains. The river crosses the border into the province of Pesaro e Urbino and flows north near Monte Catria, Cantiano, Monte Nerone, and Cagli before entering the Candigliano at Acqualagna.

References

Rivers of the Province of Perugia
Rivers of the Province of Pesaro and Urbino
Rivers of Italy